Flavomeliturgula is a genus of bees belonging to the family Andrenidae.

Species:

Flavomeliturgula berangeriae 
Flavomeliturgula centaurea 
Flavomeliturgula deserta 
Flavomeliturgula lacrymosa 
Flavomeliturgula schwarziana 
Flavomeliturgula tapana

References

Andrenidae